James Daniel Guy Hearn (born 19 June 1976 in Denham, Buckinghamshire, England) is an English singer-songwriter. He is best known as being the vocalist of boyband Ultra.

Biography
Hearn attended the same high school as Ultra's guitarist and drummer, Mike Harwood and Jon O'Mahony, respectively, where they met. He was in the same class as Harwood, and O'Mahony was a couple of years older. Hearn went on to the University of Leeds and studied Geography and Management, graduating in 1999. He was once a pentathlon athlete, but when he realized that sport was not the highest paid career choice, he turned to music.

In 1997, Hearn, Harwood, O'Mahony, and Nick Keynes, formed Ultra and released their self-titled debut album in 1999, for which Hearn wrote most of the songs.
He left the band and worked as a surveyor before he earned a master's degree from the University of Reading. Ultra reunited in 2005 and released a second album, The Sun Shines Brighter.

References

External links
 Ultra-abiglove, unofficial Italian fansite
 Ultra Forever, Ultra Unofficial Site

1976 births
Living people
English male singers
English songwriters
Alumni of the University of Leeds
Alumni of the University of Reading
Ultra (British band) members
21st-century English singers
21st-century British male singers
British male songwriters